Jens Harald Quistgaard (April 23, 1919 – January 4, 2008) was a Danish sculptor and designer, known principally for his work for the American company Dansk Designs, where he was chief designer from 1954 and for the following three decades.Though a sculptor and grounded in traditional handicrafts, he quickly established a career as an industrial designer. From the mid-1950s his tableware and kitchenware designs became synonymous with Scandinavian modern and found their way into millions of homes in the US, Europe and Japan. With his international orientation and success he was groundbreaking, and he had great significance for the place which Danish design acquired in the minds of many Americans.

In 1958, he received the Neiman Marcus Award and during the following years he was represented at major museums in Europe and the USA. Many of Jens Quistgaard's works are still produced today.

Early life and training
Jens Quistgaard grew up in an artistic home in Copenhagen and already as a boy, demonstrated unusual artistic talents. The work with handicrafts began in his mothers kitchen, where he made himself a little workshop with vice and anvil. Here he produced jewellery, hunting knives, bags and ceramics. When he was young Jens Quistgaard would often be found at the village smiths,  carpenters or joiners, and it was here he acquired the craftsmanship which he later used to produce  models in wood, metal, ceramic and glass.  
He was trained as a sculptor by his father, Harald Quistgaard (1887-1979), and was later educated as a drawer and silversmith at the technical school in Copenhagen.
During the occupation of Denmark he was active in the Resistance movement.

Work

Quistgaard started his career drawing portraits. He also produced jewellery, hunting knives, ceramic works, glass and graphic design in the form of monograms, town arms and the like. His breakthrough as an industrial designer came in 1953–54, where he fashioned the cutlery set Fjord, the first cutlery set that combined stainless steel with handles of teak.

Around the same time he designed a saucepan in cast iron for De Forenede Jernstoeberier A/S (United Iron Foundries). The pan was marketed under the name Anker-Line and was awarded the gold medal at the Triennale in Milan in 1954. In the same year, Quistgaard also received the Lunning Prize. 1954 was also the year American businessman Ted Nierenberg visited Europe, on the lookout for talented design which could be launched in the USA. After having seen the cutlery set Fjord at the Danish Museum of Art and Design in Copenhagen, he sought out the designer, and their meeting led to the foundation of the American company Dansk Designs with Quistgaard as chief designer.

Already towards the end of 1954, Fjord was introduced in New York, followed the year after by the colourful saucepan range Kobenstyle. Quistgaards designs were a big success from the beginning in the US and were quickly followed by a series of tableware and kitchenware designs: cutlery in silver and handcrafted steel; jugs and saucepans in steel, copper and cast iron; crockery in stoneware; glass; trays, bowls, pepper mills and other objects in staved teak and exotic wood sorts, as well as candlesticks in brass, silver and cast iron.

Quistgaard was hugely productive and for Danish Designs alone fashioned more than 4000 products. It is a production which spans a large range of materials and utility items, and which is created from a philosophy that utility items for the kitchen and the table should function together harmoniously. To set the table and arrange with Quistgaard's designs became from the end of the 1950s and during the 1960s identical with "modern living" and Scandinavian style. Where clean lines, sculptural form and natural materials went hand in hand.

Significant designs and later life

The end of the 1950s and the first half of the 1960s were Quistgaard's most productive years for Dansk Designs. In 1958 he designed the cutlery set Toke in steel and bamboo as well as the dinner set Flamestone in stoneware; the cutlery set Tjorn in sterling silver from 1959, the Festivaal line from 1960 of lacquered bowls and trays in many colors, together with a series of industrial designs in exotic wood sorts, Rare Woods from 1961. The series together with the other woodware was produced by Nissens Woodworking Factory in Denmark, which Quistgaard also designed special works for in the 1960s, amongst others the unusual Stick chair from 1966.

At the end of the 1950s Jens Quistgaard began designing and overseeing the construction of a large villa in Armonk, north of New York, for his American business partner Ted Nierenberg. Quistgaard designed everything, from the large roof constructions and window sections to the doorhandles, bathtub and spiral staircase. The villa was completed in 1961 as a demonstration of Quistgaard's ideal about architectural wholeness.

Quistgaard's success escalated throughout the 1960s. His works for Dansk Designs were  marketed in all major cities in the US, but he was also successful in Europe and Japan. Dansk Designs started their own shop in the High Street in Copenhagen, in London and in Stockholm, and Quistgaard's designs were exhibited and sold in Tokyo, Berlin, Paris, Zürich, Melbourne, Johannesburg and many other big cities.

Quistgaard continued as chief designer for Dansk Designs until the start of the 1980s, when he moved to Rome. He lived there until 1993, and returned to Denmark, where he continued to design until a few months before his death in 2008. In 2006 he received an honorary grant from the Danish National Banks Anniversary Fund of 1968, and in 2009 was portrayed as a person and as a designer in the documentary film "A Saucepan for My Wife" 

Quistgaard died at age 88 on January 4, 2008, at his home "Strandgaarden" near Vordingborg, Denmark. He was survived by a daughter, a son and several grandchildren. He is buried in Gimlinge Cemetery.

Awards and distinctions 
Lunning Prize 1954
 Gold and silver medals at Milan Triennial 1954
 The Neiman Marcus Award for Distinguished Service in the Field of Fashion 1958
 Der goldene Löffel, Munich 1962
 Honorary grant from the Danish Central Bank's Anniversary Foundation 2006

Museums

Exhibitions

Selected works
 Champagne flatware. Silver. O.V. Mogensen 1947
 Tea set and coffee set. Sterling silver, handwrought. Hermann Jacobsen o. 1948
 Teapot, unglazed earthenware. Palshus Keramik 1949-50
 Shark fin can opener. Stainless steel. Raadvad A/S 1950
 Fjord flatware. Handforged stainless steel and teak, Dansk Designs 1954
 Ankerline kitchenware. Enameled cast iron. De Forenede Jernstøberier 1954
 Kobenstyle kitchenware. Enamel on steel. Dansk Designs 1955
 Candle holders, brass. Dansk Designs 1956
 Ice bucket, teak. Dansk Designs 1958
 Flamestone dinnerware, fluted stoneware. Dansk Designs 1958
 Variation V flatware. Handforged stainless steel. Dansk Designs 1957
 Toke flatware. Handforged stainless steel and bamboo. Dansk Designs 1958
 Tjorn flatware. Sterling silver. Dansk Designs 1959
 Relief. Stoneware. Kronjyden 1969-60
 Festivaal table top collection. Lacquer on maple. Dansk Designs 1960
 House for Ted Nierenberg, Armonk, New York 1961
 Rare Wood table top collection. Trays, bowls, ice buckets, pepper mills. Dansk Designs 1961
 Flamestone dinnerware, smooth stoneware. Dansk Designs 1964
 Stick Chair, Brazilian rosewood, chromed steel and leather. Nissen, Langaa 1966
 Simplicity barware. Glass. Dansk Designs 1967
 Jette flatware. Handforged stainless steel, Dansk Designs 1968

Literature
 Bagner, Alex: Hide and teak, i: Wallpaper*, October 2008, s. 128-134
 Eidelberg, Martin (Ed.): Design 1935-1965. What Modern Was, New York: Harry N Abrams 1991. 
 Byars, Mel: The Design Encyclopedia, New York: The Museum of Modern Art 2004. |  
 Fiell, Charlotte and Peter: Scandinavian Design, Köln: Taschen 2002. 
 Fiell, Charlotte and Peter (Eds): 60s Decorative Art, Köln: Taschen 2000. 
 FORM - fra tønder til trend, Kulturhistorisk Museum Randers, u.å.
 Fox, Margalit ("Jens Quistgaard, 88, a Designer of Popular Tableware, Is Dead". New York Times (2008-02-02).
 Guldberg, Stig: Jens Quistgaard - The Man Who Put Danish Modern on America's Tables, i: Modernism Magazine, Spring 2011
 Guldberg, Stig: The Sculptor Who Put Danish Modern on the Map, i: DANSK - Design by Jens Quistgaard, HEART - Herning Museum of Contemporary Art, 2015
 Koelln, Georgann. "Prolific Tableware Designer Has Introduced 2,000 Styles", The Blade (newspaper), October 17, 1982.
 New Technologies. Phaidon Design Classics, Volume Three, Phaidon 2006.
 Perlson, Mark: Danish Pepper. Jens Quistgaard's Teak Pepper Mills, 2008. 
 Reif, Rita. "Accessories Designed by Dane Proving Popular in U.S. Homes; Jens Quistgaard, Son of Noted Sculptor, a Born Craftsman", The New York Times, October 10, 1958.
 The New York Times, September 22, 1961

Film
The Designer Jens Quistgaard: A Saucepan for My Wife. A Documentary Film by Stig Guldberg. 
DVD + booklet 55 p. ABCFilm, Denmark 2009.

See also 

 Dansk Designs
 Danish Modern
 Scandinavian design

References 

1919 births
2008 deaths
Danish industrial designers
Danish resistance members